The BIMP-EAGA Friendship Games is a sporting biennial event between the regions of the four member countries of the BIMP-EAGA. The inaugural edition of the games took place in General Santos, Mindanao, Philippines from 25–27 April 1996.

History
The former Philippine President Fidel V. Ramos proposed the said subregional economic co-operation initiative between the border areas of 
Brunei, Indonesia, Malaysia and the Philippines in order to accelerate the economic development between these countries. The planned cooperation came to fruition with the foundation of BIMP-EAGA on 24 March 1994.
The first friendship game was inaugurated in General Santos, Philippines, on 25–27 April 1996. Subsequently, the second friendship games were held at Kuching, Sarawak, Malaysia in 24–26 October 1997. The friendship games was in hiatus for 5 years and only made a comeback in Puerto Princesa City, Palawan, Philippines on 23–26 April 2003.

Participating countries

Editions

See also
 ASEAN Para Games
 East Asian Games
 Asian Games
 ASEAN School Games

References

Multi-sport events
BIMP-EAGA sports event
ASEAN sports events
Recurring sporting events established in 1996